Wachusett Meadow Wildlife Sanctuary is a  wildlife sanctuary located in Princeton, Massachusetts, owned by the Massachusetts Audubon Society. Charles T. Crocker III donated 600 acres of land along with several buildings to Mass Audubon in 1956. The former farmstead includes a nature center, 12 miles of trails through woodlands, wetlands, and meadows, and a large pond with canoe rentals in season.

Programs
Wachusett Meadow has an outdoor summer day camp, seasonal special events, and year-round educational programs for preschoolers to adults.

See also
 List of nature centers in Massachusetts

References

External links

Wildlife refuges in Massachusetts
Nature centers in Massachusetts
Princeton, Massachusetts
Protected areas of Worcester County, Massachusetts
Massachusetts Audubon Society
Museums in Worcester County, Massachusetts
Tourist attractions in Worcester County, Massachusetts